Jacob Buus Jacobsen (born 7 March 1997) is a Danish footballer who plays as a right-back for AC Horsens.

Club career

OB
Buus started his career at Fraugde GIF as a youth player before joining OB as a U12 player. He signed a professional contract until the summer 2018 with OB on 22 March 2016, and was promoted to the first team squad.

Dreyer got his debut on 29 August 2017 in a 1–0 victory against Dalum IF in the Danish Cup, coming on in the second half to replace Ryan Laursen. He ended the game, making the assist to the winning goal. Buus played his first Danish Superliga game in March 2018 against AGF. These two games was also the only games he played for the club before it was announced, that Buus would leave the club by the end of his contract, which was on 30 June 2018.

FC Fredericia
Buus signed a 2-year contract with FC Fredericia in the Danish 1st Division on 10 July 2018, after a successful trial, playing two friendly games for the club.

AC Horsens
On 26 June 2020 Danish Superliga club, AC Horsens, confirmed that Buus would join the club on 1 August 2020, signing a deal until the summer 2023.

Waasland-Beveren
After a year in Horsens, Buus was sold to Belgian club Waasland-Beveren on 16 June 2021, signing a deal until the summer 2023.

Return to AC Horsens
On 23 January 2023, Buus returned AC Horsens, signing a deal until June 2026.

References

External links
 
 Jacob Buus on DBU 

1997 births
Living people
Danish men's footballers
Danish expatriate men's footballers
Association football defenders
Denmark youth international footballers
Footballers from Odense
Danish Superliga players
Danish 1st Division players
Challenger Pro League players
Odense Boldklub players
FC Fredericia players
AC Horsens players
S.K. Beveren players
Danish expatriate sportspeople in Belgium
Expatriate footballers in Belgium